Nicholas Sebek (October 11, 1927November 27, 2007) was an American football quarterback in the National Football League for the Washington Redskins.  He played college football at Indiana University and was drafted in the 25th round of the 1949 NFL Draft.

External links
Pro-Football Reference
Obituary

1927 births
2007 deaths
Sportspeople from Niagara Falls, New York
Players of American football from New York (state)
American football quarterbacks
Washington Redskins players
Indiana Hoosiers football players